Arundel School is a private, day and boarding school for girls aged 12–18 in Harare, Zimbabwe.

Arundel School was ranked 48th out of the top 100 best high schools in Africa, based upon quality of education, student engagement, strength and activities of alumnae, school profile, internet and news visibility.

Arundel School is a member of the Association of Trust Schools (ATS) and the Head is a member of the Conference of Heads of Independent Schools in Zimbabwe (CHISZ).

Boarding
Arundel School offers boarding accommodation on two levels which are weekly boarding for girls who return home at the weekends, and full boarding places for girls whose families are further afield. There are four boarding houses, Angwa, Sabi, Shire and Kafue, each accommodating age groups of girls under the guidance and care of full-time House Mistresses, Matrons and staff, assisted by senior girls. The Boarding Mistress has responsibility for all the boarding houses and is assisted by the deputy head girl of boarding as well as the boarding prefects.

Shire and Kafue hostels have recently been renovated and house full and weekly boarders forms 2 to 6. Sabi hostel houses form 1 and 2 full and weekly boarders and has also been recently renovated.

Competitive houses
The school is divided into six competitive houses, Austen, Bronte, Burney, Eliot, Gaskell and Irwin. All academic, sporting and cultural achievements earn points for their house. There are many school trophies which are awarded at the end of each term in recognition of the girls individual and collective achievements, including trophies for sporting events, academic achievements, school pride, flower arranging and deportment.   .

Notable alumni

 Ellah Wakatama Allfrey OBE - publisher and literary critic
 Professor Fareda Banda - Academic, scholar, author
 Rutendo Chimbaru - Athlete
 Tsitsi Dangarembga - Novelist, filmmaker and playwright
 Mati Hlatshwayo Davis - Director of Health for the City of St. Louis Department of Health
 Alexandra Fuller - Novelist
 Paula Hawkins (author) - Novelist
 Elana Hill - Zimbabwe Olympic Rower
 Fadzayi Mahere - Advocate of the High Court and Supreme Court of Zimbabwe, LLM Cambridge
 Vimbai Mutinhiri - Model, actress, television personality
 Sindisiwe van Zyl - Physician, radio DJ, columnist, health activist and researcher

See also

List of schools in Zimbabwe
List of boarding schools
St. George's College

References

External links
Arundel School website
Arundel School Profile on the ATS website
Arundel School's Twitter profile

Schools in Harare
Private schools in Zimbabwe
High schools in Zimbabwe
Girls' schools in Zimbabwe
Girls' high schools in Zimbabwe
Day schools in Zimbabwe
Boarding schools in Zimbabwe
Cambridge schools in Zimbabwe
Educational institutions established in 1955
1955 establishments in the Federation of Rhodesia and Nyasaland
Member schools of the Association of Trust Schools